The Leader of the Social Democratic Party (Vorsitzender der Sozialdemokratischen Partei Deutschlands) is the most senior political figure within the Social Democratic Party of Germany. Since December 2019, the office has been held jointly by Saskia Esken and Norbert Walter-Borjans.

The Leader of the Social Democratic Party is supported by a General Secretary, which since December 2021 has been Kevin Kühnert. Furthermore, the leaders are supported by five deputy leaders, which currently are Klara Geywitz, Hubertus Heil, Kevin Kühnert, Serpil Midyatli, and Anke Rehlinger.

Selection

The Leader of Social Democratic Party is elected by Party conferences, usually with around 600 delegates representing all the state and local party chapters. To stand as leader, a candidate needs to be nominated by 90 "Ortsvereine", local chapters. It is unusual for more than one person to be nominated as party leader, as the decision who becomes leader is usually made behind the scenes within the Presidium and Federal Executive. This has drawn hefty criticism, so much so that in the last leadership election in April 2018, Simone Lange challenged Andrea Nahles, the candidate nominated by the Federal Executive. This challenge, in German called "Kampfabstimmung" has only happened twice before once in 1993 and once in 1995.

Leaders of the Social Democratic Party (1949–present)
A list of leaders (including acting leaders) since 1949.

See also
 History of the Social Democratic Party of Germany

References

Social Democratic Party Germany
Lists of German politicians